KQLH-LP (92.5 FM) is a low-power FM radio station branded as "KQLH Studio 92.5 FM".  The station is operated by Arrowhead Alliance of the Inland Empire broadcasting a favorites music format with songs from the 1950s to the 1980s. The station is licensed to Yucaipa, California and is broadcasting to the Inland Empire area.

It features former Atlanta morning man and Georgia Radio Hall of Member Rick Ruhl with the "Rick in the morning, morning show" from 6AM until 9 AM. Rick Dees hosts the afternoon show from 2PM to 6PM. KQLH LPFM was built by Mark Westwood, who is also General Manager of NBC affiliated KCAA 1050 am and 106.5 FM. Mark also does middays on Studio 92.5.

News Article: Yucaipa's only radio station is up and running 

The Internal Revenue Service finds it to be a 501(c) organization, underwriting donations may be tax deductible under section 501 (c) 3 of the Internal Revenue Code (consult tax advisor). The station has a policy of affirmative action and equal opportunity. There are no paid employees.

References

External links
 

QLH-LP
Talk radio stations in the United States
QLH-LP
Radio stations established in 2017
2017 establishments in California